Frances Nelson (November 7, 1892 in St. Paul, Minnesota -  January, 1975 in The Bronx, New York) was an American silent film actress.

Selected filmography
The Country Girl (1915) directed by Clem Easton, also starring George Bailey, Jim O'Neill.
Love's Crucible (1916)
Human Driftwood (1916)
The Decoy (1916)
The Almighty Dollar (1916)
One of Many (1917)
The Beautiful Lie (1917)
The Power of Decision (1917)

References

External links
 

1892 births
1975 deaths
20th-century American actresses
American film actresses